The 1950 state election in Queensland, Australia was held on 29 April 1950.

By-elections
 On 10 September 1949, Ivor Marsden (Labor) was elected to succeed David Gledson (Labor), who had died on 14 May 1949, as the member for Ipswich.
 On 10 September 1949, Tom Moores (Labor) was elected to succeed Kerry Copley (Labor), who had died on 18 July 1949, as the member for Kurilpa.

Retiring Members

Labor
Harry Bruce MLA (The Tableland)
Stephen Theodore MLA (Herbert)

Country
William Brand MLA (Isis)

Liberal
Charles Wanstall MLA (Toowong)

Candidates
Sitting members at the time of the election are shown in bold text.

See also
 1950 Queensland state election
 Members of the Queensland Legislative Assembly, 1947–1950
 Members of the Queensland Legislative Assembly, 1950–1953
 List of political parties in Australia

References
 

Candidates for Queensland state elections